"Flanders' Ladder" is the twenty-first and final episode of the twenty-ninth season of the American animated television series The Simpsons, and the 639th episode of the series overall. It aired in the United States on Fox on May 20, 2018.

The episode was dedicated in memory of author Tom Wolfe who had guest starred on the show in the episode "Moe'N'a Lisa". He died from an infection on May 14, 2018.

Plot
On a stormy night, Bart tricks Lisa into playing The Scary Maze Game and posts photos of her having been scared into knocking over his laundry hamper and covered in his dirty clothes on the Internet. After dinner, the power line gets hit by lightning, cutting the family off from the Internet.

To pass the time, the family digs up their old VHS player, but when it breaks, Bart and Homer go to Ned Flanders' house to steal his router. Bart climbs the ladder to the attic, but as Homer is distracted by his phone, Bart loses his balance, gets hit by lightning and falls into a coma. Dr. Hibbert says that Bart will be fine as long as the family talk to him and reassure him. However, Lisa is left alone with Bart, and because he scared and shamed her earlier, she gets revenge on him by giving him nightmares.

He wakes up in his bed as the ghost of Maude Flanders arrives, scaring him. Next, Milhouse Van Houten enters while he decorates Bart's treehouse with crosses to keep ghosts out, though that does not work as Maude's ghost returns, but Bart scares her off with Homer's dirty socks. Milhouse suggests Bart talk to his psychiatrist Samuel Elkins, but it turns out he is a ghost too, having committed suicide five minutes before Bart's appointment, intending for his patients to blame themselves for his death.

Elkins then informs Bart that he has a gift for seeing and communicating with the dead, and requests his help with revenge against a rival doctor. Bart responds by tricking the rival into playing The Scary Maze Game, causing a heart attack, allowing Elkins to move on to the afterlife. More ghosts of the show's deceased characters appear asking Bart for help, which he does. Lisa, though, continues to give him nightmares until Hibbert advises her to stop, as this could give him permanent brain damage.

As Lisa apologizes to Bart for her actions, Homer walks in with a Krusty Burger meal for Bart, exhausted, saying he is dead, which only digs Bart deeper into this nightmare, much to Lisa's horror. At this same moment, Bart agrees to help Maude, who wants revenge on Homer for causing her death. Bart then arranges for Jimbo Jones, Dolph Starbeam and Kearney Zzyzwicz to ambush and scare Homer by firing shirts at him. While Maude happily moves on after this, Homer's spirit rises up from his body. This is not what Bart wanted, as he did not mean to kill him. Bart then pleads for Homer not to go to Heaven, while Lisa pleads for Bart to stay with her, as he apparently begins to flatline.

As Homer begins to ascend into Heaven, feeling there is nothing left for him, Bart, not wanting the accidental murder of his father hanging on his head, shoots a shirt to the light of Heaven, shutting it off. This causes Homer's spirit to fall and land back in his body, restoring him to life. An enraged Homer strangles Bart for ruining his opportunity. Lisa continues to apologize to a flatlined Bart, admitting that she loves him and wants him back, unknowingly restarting his pulse. Bart wakes up, much to Lisa's relief, and when asked, Lisa admits to giving him nightmares, but he is not angry at her about it and instead asks her to teach him how to do that to other people, which she agrees to.

Later, while the family celebrates Bart coming out of his coma, Bart tells Lisa he has discovered how everyone will die, though Lisa does not want to hear it, in a parody of the closing montage from the Six Feet Under series finale:

 Waylon Smithers Jr commits suicide at age 50 by jumping into the Power Plant cooling towers after Mr. Burns marries Angelina Jolie.
 Homer dies at 59 by getting shot by police after exiting a food bank with a sandwich where they thought he was robbing it. Clancy Wiggum dies at 62 after eating the sandwich.
 Marge dies at 84 peacefully next to Ned, who appends a picture of her on the wall with his many other dead wives including Edna Krabappel.
 Bart explodes fireworks in Seymour Skinner's direction, saying "Skinner Sucks." Skinner dies at 119 from a heart attack after that, but his powered wheelchair rolls over Bart with his body on it, killing him at 80.
 Lisa dies at 98, realizing that her lifetime of meditation has been a waste of time.
 Ralph Wiggum dies at 120 as an evil king, poisoned by his descendant.
 Maggie is depicted as a galaxy, and "never dies".

Reception
"Flanders' Ladder" scored a 0.8 rating with a 3 share and was watched by 2.10 million people, making it Fox's highest rated show of the night.

Dennis Perkins of The A.V. Club gave this episode a C−, stating, "’Flanders’ Ladder’ is a piddling mess of an episode, peppered with a laugh or two, that never commits either to going for real emotional resonance, or comically undercutting it. So it just bobs along, occasionally landing on a funny idea but built on a disastrous foundation of mischaracterization and glibness. So when the ending comes, only the least discriminating would feel its montage of character deaths as anything but a cheap gambit to close out a truly disappointing episode (and season) with unmerited weight." Screen Rant called it the best episode of the 29th season.

References

External links
 

2018 American television episodes
The Simpsons (season 29) episodes
Television episodes about death
Television episodes about nightmares
Television episodes set in hospitals